KAMT-LP, UHF analog channel 50, was a low-powered TeleFutura-affiliated television station licensed to Amarillo, Texas, United States. The station was owned by Drewry Communications.

History

The station was founded in 2005.

On June 25, 2008, original owner Equity Media Holdings disclosed that it was selling KAMT to Luken Communications, LLC.

Equity Media Holdings has been in chapter 11 bankruptcy since December 2008 and offers by Luken Communications to acquire Equity-owned stations in six markets have since been withdrawn. On April 10, 2009, Equity Media announced a fire sale of all television stations - KAMT was set for an asking price of $750,000.  However, a buyer was not found until October, when Drewry Communications Group, then-owner of KFDA-TV (now owned by Gray Television), announced that it would purchase the station as part of a larger deal.

The station's license was surrendered to the Federal Communications Commission (FCC) on October 6, 2010, and the KAMT-LP call sign was cancelled by the FCC that same day.

References

UniMás network affiliates
AMT-LP
Television channels and stations established in 2005
Spanish-language television stations in Texas
2010 disestablishments in Texas
Defunct television stations in the United States
Television channels and stations disestablished in 2010
2005 establishments in Texas
AMT-LP